The Walter's Mill Bridge is a historic covered bridge in Somerset Township, Somerset County, Pennsylvania.  It was built in 1830, and is a  Burr truss bridge, with vertical plank siding and a tin covered gable roof. The bridge crosses Haupt's Run.  It is one of 10 covered bridges in Somerset County.

It was added to the National Register of Historic Places in 1980.

See also
Somerset Historical Center

References

External links
Walter's Mill Covered Bridge (Somerset Historical Center)

Covered bridges in Somerset County, Pennsylvania
Covered bridges on the National Register of Historic Places in Pennsylvania
Bridges completed in 1830
Bridges in Somerset County, Pennsylvania
1830 establishments in Pennsylvania
National Register of Historic Places in Somerset County, Pennsylvania
Road bridges on the National Register of Historic Places in Pennsylvania
Wooden bridges in Pennsylvania
Burr Truss bridges in the United States